Police district is a form of division of a geographical area patrolled by a police force. The 1885 Encyclopædia Britannica stated:

Police forces using this format include:

 Chicago Police Department
 Baltimore Police Department
 York Regional Police
 Halton Regional Police Service
 Nassau County Police Department
 Suffolk County Police Department

References

See also
 Regional police
 Police division
 Police precinct 

Police divisions